The Copa Chile 2008 was the 29th edition of the tournament. It began on July 6, 2008, and ended on February 17, 2009. The winner of Copa Chile 2008 is eligible to play a berth in the Copa Sudamericana 2009. In the final Universidad de Concepción defeated the third division team Deportes Ovalle 2–1, thereby claiming their first title.

Calendar

Preliminary round 

|}

First round 

* Qualified as "Best Loser"

Second round

Third round

Quarterfinals

Semifinals

Final

Top goalscorers

See also 
 Primera División 2008
 Primera B
 Tercera División

References 
 Official site

Copa Chile
Chile
Copa Chile seasons